The Mock Turtle is a fictional character devised by Lewis Carroll from his popular 1865 book Alice's Adventures in Wonderland. Its name is taken from a dish that was popular in the Victorian period, mock turtle soup.

Alice's Adventures in Wonderland

Carroll enjoyed such puns on Victorian fashions and etiquette, and showed this frequently. The description and drawing by John Tenniel gives comedic value to the Mock Turtle, as he is clearly an assemblage of creatures, therefore not a real turtle as his name rightly suggests.

Alice encounters the Mock Turtle with the Gryphon. The Mock Turtle is a very melancholic character, it is thought because   he used to be a real turtle. He tells Alice his history of going to school in the sea.  He says his teacher was an old sea turtle called Tortoise and when Alice asks him why he was called Tortoise if he was a turtle the Mock Turtle answers, "We called him tortoise because he taught us!" ("tortoise" and "taught us" both being pronounced  in Carroll's dialect).

Media incarnations
 The Mock Turtle appeared in Alice in Wonderland (1931) played by Gus Alexander.
 The Mock Turtle appeared in Alice in Wonderland (1933) played by Cary Grant.

 When it came to the development of Disney's animated Alice in Wonderland (1951), the Mock Turtle was planned to appear. However, the Mock Turtle alongside the Jabberwock and the Gryphon were discarded for pacing reasons. The Mock Turtle did appear in a Disney commercial with Alice and the Gryphon.
 The Mock Turtle appeared in The Hall of Fame (1955) episode "Alice in Wonderland" played by the puppeteer Burr Tillstrom.
 The Mock Turtle appears in The Wednesday Play (1965) episode "Alice" played by Norman Scace. He later appeared in the episode "Alice in Wonderland" played by John Gielgud.
 The Mock Turtle appears in Alice's Adventures in Wonderland (1972) played by Michael Hordern.
 The Mock Turtle appears in Alicja (1982) played by Jack Wild.
 The Mock Turtle appears in the Great Performances (1983) episode "Alice in Wonderland" played by Donald O'Connor.
 The Mock Turtle appears in Alice in Wonderland (1985) (TV) played by Ringo Starr.
 The Mock Turtle appears in Dreamchild (1985) performed by Steve Whitmire and voiced by Alan Bennett. The Mock Turtle, along with the Gryphon, are the first Wonderland characters encountered in the dreams and imaginations of the now elderly Alice Hargreaves. The perpetually sobbing turtle symbolizes the Rev. Charles Dodgson (who stutteringly performs the character's song to a young adult Alice's derision). After making her peace with Dodgson's memory, following an Oxford University choir's performance of "The Mock Turtle Song," Alice dreams again, with Dodgson in a crouching position akin to that of the turtle. The grinning Dodgson turns around, and joins Alice and the Gryphon in joyous laughter. The mock turtle himself, however, remains morose, prompting his companion to tell him to shut up.
 The Mock Turtle appears in Alice in Wonderland (1986) (TV) played by Roy Skelton.
 The Mock Turtle appears in Alice in Wonderland (1999) (TV)  played by Gene Wilder.
The Mock Turtle appears in the Sunsoft's 2006 mobile game . He is the head chef employed by the Queen of Hearts and tries to cook Ariko (the "Alice" of the game), but is stopped by the Queen.
 The Mock Turtle makes an appearance in the computer game American McGee's Alice, having the head of a bull and the body of a turtle. In the beginning, Alice has to help the Mock Turtle find his shell, which was stolen by the Duchess.
 In the sequel Alice: Madness Returns he is a ship's captain and helps Alice reach the Carpenter's underwater theater. 
 There is a creature called a Mock Turtle in The Elder Scrolls Legends: Battlespire.

 In Alice in Wonderland (2010), the Mock Turtle does not appear, but a portrait of him can be seen clearly in the Hatter's room to the left of the Knave when he breaks in.
 The Mock Turtle appeared in the Once Upon a Time in Wonderland episode "Trust Me". In this show, the Mock Turtle is a giant aquatic turtle that is as large as a small island (somewhat similar to the turtle variation of the Aspidochelone). Alice and the Knave of Hearts end up on it after being dropped by Silvermist. Upon this discovery, Alice takes advantage of this and commands the Mock Turtle to take it to the other side of the lake.
 The Mock Turtle appears in Marissa Meyer's novel Heartless in which we get to see the reason for his transformation from turtle to mock turtle.

In popular culture
 "The Mock Turtle" was the name of a costumed criminal obsessed with Alice in Wonderland and other fantasies in the Astro City universe (as a possible reference to DC Comics' similarly Wonderland-obsessed villain, the Mad Hatter).
 In the 1940 screwball comedy film His Girl Friday, Cary Grant's character Walter Burns shouts at another character, "Get back in there, you Mock Turtle!"
 Steely Dan recorded a demo entitled "The Mock Turtle Song;" this song was never recorded for a studio album but has been released on compilations and the band has played it live. The lyrics were directly taken from a song in the section in the book ("The Lobster Quadrille").
 Jazz fusion band Bruford recorded a song entitled "Fainting in Coils," which is included as the fifth track of the band's 1979 release One of a Kind. The song includes narration by Sam Alder, Anthea Norman Taylor and band founder Bill Bruford as the Mock Turtle, consisting of a 74-word excerpt from "The Mock Turtle's Story." In this excerpt, the Mock Turtle tells Alice about some of things he studied in school, which among other things included "...Drawling, Stretching, and Fainting in Coils."
The Mock Turtles are an English indie rock band. Their most famous song "Can You Dig It?," which was released in the UK in 1991, charted at number 18; and then, slightly remixed, it again reached number 18 when re-released in 2003.
The Mock Turtle appears as a character in the 1997 video game "An Elder Scrolls Legend: Battlespire".

References

Turtles in literature
Fantasy creatures
Fictional turtles
Literary characters introduced in 1865
Lewis Carroll characters